The Cannon House Office Building, often called the "Old House Office Building," completed in 1908, is the oldest congressional office building as well as a significant example of the Beaux-Arts style of architecture. It occupies a site south of the United States Capitol bounded by Independence Avenue, First Street, New Jersey Avenue, and C Street S.E. In 1962 the building was named for former Speaker of the United States House of Representatives Joseph Gurney Cannon.

History

The first congressional office buildings were constructed immediately after the turn of the 20th century to relieve overcrowding in the United States Capitol. Previously, members who wanted office space had to rent quarters or borrow space in committee rooms. In March 1901 Congress authorized Architect of the Capitol Edward Clark to draw plans for fireproof office buildings for both the House and Senate adjacent to the Capitol grounds. In March 1903 the acquisition of sites and construction of the buildings were authorized. In April 1904, the prominent New York City architectural firm of Carrère and Hastings was retained. Thomas Hastings took charge of the House Office Building project, while John Carrère oversaw the construction of an almost identical office building (now named the Russell Senate Office Building) for the United States Senate. Their Beaux Arts designs were restrained complements to the Capitol.

The Cannon Building was occupied during the 60th Congress in December 1907. By 1913, however, the House had outgrown the available office space, and fifty-one rooms were added to the original structure by raising the roof and constructing a fifth floor that is visible only from the enclosed court and otherwise obscured on the building's public face. Originally there were 397 offices and fourteen committee rooms in the Cannon Building; the 1932 remodeling resulted in 85 two- or three-room suites, 10 single rooms, and 23 committee rooms. During the late 1960s, the House Beauty Shop, a salon which catered to Congresspersons, their spouses, and employees, was relocated to the Cannon House Office Building from the smaller Longworth House Office Building under the auspices of the Beauty Shop Committee.

2015 renovations
In January 2015, a top-to-bottom renovation of the Cannon House Office Building began. Completion is expected to take ten years and cost $752.7 million. Initially, renovation will be focused on upgrading the building utilities, but will progress on to a wing-by-wing exterior and interior reconstruction. According to Bill Weidemeyer (Superintendent of the House), the building "is plagued by safety, health, environmental and operational issues that are rapidly worsening. Many of the building’s systems are original from the 1908 construction."

Architecture
Architecturally, the elevations are divided into a rusticated base and a colonnade with an entablature and balustrade. The colonnades with thirty-four Doric columns that face the Capitol are echoed by pilasters on the sides of the building, and very inspired by the Louvre Colonnade in Paris. The Cannon Building is faced with marble and limestone; while the Senate's Russell Building's base and terrace are gray granite.

Modern for its time, the building initially included such facilities as forced-air ventilation systems, steam heat, individual lavatories with hot and cold running water and ice water, telephones, and electricity. Both the Cannon Building and the Russell Building are connected to the Capitol by underground passages.

Of special architectural interest is the rotunda. Eighteen Corinthian columns support an entablature and a coffered dome, whose glazed oculus floods the rotunda with natural light. Twin marble staircases lead from the rotunda to an imposing Caucus Room, which features Corinthian pilasters, a full entablature, and a richly detailed ceiling.

Cannon Tunnel
The Cannon Tunnel connects the Cannon House Office Building to the Capitol. The tunnel is lined with artwork from the annual Congressional Art Competition for high school students. Branching off the entrance to Cannon Tunnel is a separate tunnel to the Longworth House Office Building, and entrances to a cafeteria, shoe shiner/cobbler, and a Legislative Resource Center. Unlike the tunnels from the Capitol to the Senate Office Buildings and the Rayburn tunnel, the Cannon Tunnel has no subway line, and is primarily a pedestrian pathway. In addition, a separate tunnel runs between the building and the neighboring James Madison Memorial Building, a part of the Library of Congress.

Gallery

Notes

References

External links

 Cannon Renewal Project FAQs, Architect of the Capitol
 Ghosts of DC blog: Three Bits of Trivia About the Cannon House Office Building

Carrère and Hastings buildings
Congressional office buildings
Beaux-Arts architecture in Washington, D.C.
Government buildings completed in 1908
1908 establishments in Washington, D.C.